"Squad D" is the title of a short story by American writer Stephen King. Originally written in the late 1970s, the story was rejected by Harlan Ellison, who thought it needed work; the anthology The Last Dangerous Visions for which it was intended was never published.

The story was finally published in the anthology Shivers VIII, edited by Richard Chizmar and published by Chizmar′s Cemetery Dance Publications on April 18, 2019.

Plot
Josh Bortman is the only surviving member of "Squad D". He was in the hospital for hemorrhoids on the day that the other nine members ran afoul of a trap laid by the Viet Cong. Torn apart by guilt, Bortman sends a photo he shot to every family of the victims; it shows the squad, his best and only friends. Three years later, Dale Clewson – father of the late Squad D soldier, Billy – desperately tries to get in touch with Josh, because Josh now can be seen in the photo. When he reaches Josh′s father, he finds out that Josh committed suicide and was hence able to rejoin his friends on the picture.

Themes
The story includes themes and images to which King would return in later works, including survivor's guilt ("The Things They Left Behind"), the idea of changing pictures ("Stationary Bike" and Duma Key), and the U.S.'s involvement in Vietnam (Hearts in Atlantis).

References

1970 short stories
Short stories by Stephen King